New Turgutlu Stadium is a stadium that is currently under construction in Turgutlu, Turkey. It will have a capacity of 12,000 spectators and will be the new home of Turgutluspor of the TFF Third League. It will replace the club's current home, 7 Eylül Stadium.

References

Football venues in Turkey
Stadiums under construction
Sport in Manisa
Buildings and structures under construction in Turkey